The Mob is a British media production company, based in London and Manchester and celebrates its 25th year in 2023.  The company has produced commercials and content for brands including Johnnie Walker, Sony Playstation, Audi, VW, Bosch, JD Williams, Ao.com, Etihad Airlines for example, for a variety of national and international advertising agencies & brands.

The Mob also a leading specialist in creating sport content and advertising under the brand Mob Sport shooting films with high-profile athletes, sports and sponsor brands including many Premiership football clubs such as Liverpool, Arsenal, Manchester United, Everton, Manchester City and European clubs Juventus, Real Madrid and Bayern Munich.    Mob Sport has also producing long form sport documentaries: What Rio did Next, A Year in the Life of Michael Owen, Bosman: The Player you changed Football and most recently sell-out DVD & #1 ranked Sport Documentary on Amazon, Robbo - The Bryan Robson Story.    Mob Sport is currently in production following Codie Smith, England's youngest amateur boxer, as he turns professional. 

The company is now a stand-alone having separated from the long form arm, The Mob Film & TV Co, and is run by company directors John Brocklehurst & Mark Collins.    Part of the group also owns boutique post facility in Manchester City centre, Rabble Post Production.

Most recently the company has launched a new unique search based website featuring a 'Directors Directory', aiming to be a production first company finding directors for each project rather than relying on the traditional advertising roster model.   Though they still retain a select group of directors that have long associations with the company including LA based movie director Paul WS Anderson.

References

External links
http://www.mobfilm.com
https://www.lbbonline.com/news/standing-out-from-the-crowd-how-the-mob-is-rewriting-the-uk-production-industry-playbook

Film production companies of the United Kingdom